Barnabé Mubumbyi (born 24 July 1994) is a Rwandan football striker who currently plays for Valbo FF.

References

1994 births
Living people
Rwandan footballers
Rwanda international footballers
APR F.C. players
Bugesera FC players
Kramfors-Alliansen Fotboll players
Valbo FF players
Association football forwards
Rwandan expatriate footballers
Expatriate footballers in Sweden
Rwandan expatriate sportspeople in Sweden
People from Kigali
2018 African Nations Championship players
Rwanda A' international footballers